Laurence de Boysset (c. 1633 - 3 February 1728) was a French-born Danish military officer and landowner.

Early life and military career
Boysset came to  Denmark during the reign of Frederick V and began his career in Danish service in August 1683 as captain reforme in the Royal Life Guards. He was promoted to major in 1685, lieutenant colonel in 1690, and colonel in 1697. During the brief action on Zealand in 1700, on 22 July, he fended off an attempt to land enemy troops at Gyldenlund. Later that same year, he was part of an assistant corps that was sent to Sachsen and later served on the Imperial side in the  Italy. In 1702, he participated in the Action at Mantua. He returned to Denmark in 1703.

In 1706–13, he was in British-Dutch service at Brabant, first with rank of brigadier and from 1709 as major-general. He then brought part of his military corps back to Denmark. In the Great Northern War, especially in the Siege of Stralsund and  Invasion of Rugen. In 1715, he was promoted to lieutenant general.

He was made a White Knight in 1717. On 26 August 1720, he was dismissed with honour but with a very modest pension.

Other activities
Boysset purchased Basnæs in 1714 and kept it until his death. He was a member of the board of directors of Danish West India Company. A prolonged legal dispute between Boysset and the widow of general Christian Frederik Bielke ended in 1720 when Boysset was sentenced to pay more than 20,000 gylden to the king for equipment from the Italian corps.

Personal life
He married Margrethe Elisabeth Stuart (1653 - 31 July 1723) on 6 January 1691.

He died on 3 February 1728 at Basnæs and is buried at Tjæreby Church. Basnæs passed to his son, Christian Frederik de Boysset (1582-1744). Christian Frederik de Boysset was from 1730 also the owner of Espe. He sold both estates in 1736.

References

External links
 Laurence de Boysset

1630s births
1728 deaths
Danish military personnel